Kiff VandenHeuvel (born Christopher Jon VandenHeuvel) is an American actor, director and teacher of both improvisational comedy and voiceover.

He is the host of the voiceover podcast, All Over Voiceover with Kiff VH. His film credits include Batman v Superman: Dawn of Justice, Nightcrawler, La La Land, and Behind the Candelabra as Wayne (the half-brother of Liberace (Michael Douglas)). He is best known for his work as Zachary Hale Comstock in BioShock Infinite, Skavak in Star Wars: The Old Republic, Walter in Telltale's The Walking Dead, and as Cliff Rich on the Netflix series Richie Rich.

Personal life
Kiff was born in Grand Rapids, Michigan, the oldest of five sons. His youngest brother, Andrew Vanden Heuvel, discovered an asteroid in 2003. His grandfather, Ralph Heynen, was a pastor at Pine Rest, an institution in Cutlerville, Michigan. He had a radio broadcast where he would record his sermons in his study and they would be sent to radio stations across the country.  Whenever VandenHeuvel's family would visit his grandparents, he made a beeline to his grandfather's study and played with the recording equipment. This is where he credits the beginning of his VO career, playing with his grandpa's recording rig.
 
VandenHeuvel attended and graduated from Calvin College, in Grand Rapids, with a degree in Communications Arts and Sciences.

Theatre
VandenHeuvel is an alumnus of The Second City Detroit and The Second City Cleveland mainstage casts and has been working with The Second City comedy theatre since 1998.

VandenHeuvel has appeared in a world premiere in Adam Rapp's urban drama Gompers as the not-so-bright but big hearted doorman/lookout Shoe, which premiered at City Theatre Company in Pittsburgh, Pennsylvania.

Filmography

Film

Television

Video games

References

External links
 
 All Over Voiceover with Kiff VH
 Kiff VandenHeuvel

American male film actors
American male television actors
American male voice actors
Living people
Male actors from Grand Rapids, Michigan
Place of birth missing (living people)
Year of birth missing (living people)